The East London Observer was a newspaper in east London first published in 1857. From 3 November 1928 it became the City and East London Observer. World's business news and views. It was last published on 17 November 1944.

From 1888, the paper was one of those that covered the killings of Jack the Ripper in detail.

At one time it was printed by Hazell, Watson and Viney.

References 

Newspapers published in London
Publications established in 1857
Publications disestablished in 1944
1857 establishments in England